Uttarakhand Ratna is one of the two highest civilian award of the State of Uttarakhand, along with Uttarakhand Gaurav Samman. It is awarded to a person for their extraordinary contribution in any field of human endeavour. It was constituted in the year 2016 by the Government of Uttarakhand. There have been a total of 9 recipients of this award.

History
The Uttarakhand Ratna award was constituted by former Chief Minister of Uttarakhand Harish Rawat in 2016, on the occasion of 16th anniversary of Uttarakhand State Foundation Day which falls on 9 November each year.

The Award
The recipients of Uttarakhand Ratna each get a memento, commendation letter and shawl with a sum of ₹500,000.

List of Uttarakhand Ratna recipients

See also
Bharat Ratna, the highest civilian award of India
Raj Ratna, the highest civilian award given by the individual princely states of British India

References

Awards established in 2016
State awards and decorations of India
Uttarakhand